Yosef Mahalal (born 25 December 1939) is an Israeli footballer. He played in five matches for the Israel national football team from 1962 to 1965.

References

External links
 

1939 births
Living people
Israeli footballers
Footballers from Tel Aviv
Bnei Yehuda Tel Aviv F.C. players
Hapoel Ashkelon F.C. players
Hapoel Tzafririm Holon F.C. players
Hapoel Yehud F.C. players
Liga Leumit players
Israel international footballers
Association football midfielders